Elsie May Marble Wallace (1868–1946) was an American Wesleyan leader in the late nineteenth and early twentieth century.

In 1897 Wallace founded a holiness mission in Spokane, Washington.  In 1902 the mission became church, part of the Church of the Nazarene, and Wallace became the first pastor, ordained by Phineus Bresee. The church today is Spokane First Nazarene Church.

Wallace also started churches in Ashland, Oregon; Boise, Idaho, Walla Walla, Washington and Seattle, Washington.  She became district superintendent, the first woman to hold that post, and the last until 1988.

References

External links
 Elsie Wallace—Mother of the Northwest District  by Stan Ingersol, 27 September 2012

1868 births
1946 deaths
Church of the Nazarene ministers